Richard Lawrence Kennedy (12 September 1925 – 25 September 1996) was a former Australian rules footballer who played with Melbourne and Fitzroy in the Victorian Football League (VFL).

Notes

External links 

1925 births
1996 deaths
Australian rules footballers from Victoria (Australia)
Melbourne Football Club players
Fitzroy Football Club players